Montserratian Antiguans and Barbudans are Antiguans and Barbudans of Montserratian ancestry, Antiguans and Barbudans born in Montserrat or Antiguans and Barbudans with Montserratian citizenship.

Demographics (2011)

Economic Activity 

 49.52% of Montserratian Antiguans and Barbudans born in Montserrat over the age of 15 are employed.
 5.12% of Montserratian Antiguans and Barbudans born in Montserrat over the age of 15 are unemployed.
 45.01% of Montserratian Antiguans and Barbudans born in Montserrat over the age of 15 are inactive in the employment sector.

Ethnicity 

 97.95% of Montserratian Antiguans and Barbudans born in Montserrat are African.
 0.85% of Montserratian Antiguans and Barbudans born in Montserrat are mixed (Other).
 0.52% of Montserratian Antiguans and Barbudans born in Montserrat are white.
 0.34% of Montserratian Antiguans and Barbudans born in Montserrat are mixed (Black/White).
 0.17% of Montserratian Antiguans and Barbudans born in Montserrat are another ethnicity.

References 

Demographics of Antigua and Barbuda